"All I Ever Wanted" is a song recorded by American country music artist Chuck Wicks.  It was released in April 2008 as the second single from his debut album Starting Now.  Wicks co-wrote the song with Anna Wilson and Monty Powell.

Music video
The music video was directed by Kristin Barlowe and premiered in July 2008.

Chart performance
"All I Ever Wanted" debuted at number 50 on the U.S. Billboard Hot Country Songs chart for the week of May 3, 2008.

References

2008 singles
Chuck Wicks songs
Song recordings produced by Dann Huff
RCA Records Nashville singles
Songs written by Monty Powell
Songs written by Chuck Wicks
2008 songs